Keswick is a city in Keokuk County, Iowa, United States. The population was 242 at the time of the 2020 census.

History
The Burlington, Cedar Rapids and Northern Railway built a 66-mile branch to What Cheer via Keswick in 1879  The town is named for Keswick, England, the home town of a local woman who had offered lodging to the track-laying crew.

Geography
Keswick is located at  (41.453941, -92.238818).

Demographics

2010 census
As of the census of 2010, there were 246 people, 105 households, and 69 families residing in the city. The racial makeup of the city was 97.6% White, 1.2% Native American, and 1.2% from two or more races.

There were 105 households, of which 27.6% had children under the age of 18 living with them, 49.5% were married couples living together, 10.5% had a female householder with no husband present, 5.7% had a male householder with no wife present, and 34.3% were non-families. 28.6% of all households were made up of individuals, and 18.1% had someone living alone who was 65 years of age or older. The average household size was 2.34 and the average family size was 2.87.

The median age in the city was 38.3 years. 24% of residents were under the age of 18; 6.5% were between the ages of 18 and 24; 24.8% were from 25 to 44; 26% were from 45 to 64; and 18.7% were 65 years of age or older. The gender makeup of the city was 46.3% male and 53.7% female.

2000 census
As of the census of 2000, there were 295 people, 115 households, and 86 families residing in the city. The racial makeup of the city was 98.98% White, 0.34% Asian, 0.68% from other races. Hispanic or Latino of any race were 0.68% of the population.

There were 115 households, out of which 32.2% had children under the age of 18 living with them, 60.9% were married couples living together, 9.6% had a female householder with no husband present, and 25.2% were non-families. 22.6% of all households were made up of individuals, and 16.5% had someone living alone who was 65 years of age or older. The average household size was 2.57 and the average family size was 2.93.

In the city, the population was spread out, with 28.5% under the age of 18, 5.4% from 18 to 24, 27.1% from 25 to 44, 20.7% from 45 to 64, and 18.3% who were 65 years of age or older. The median age was 37 years. For every 100 females, there were 87.9 males. For every 100 females age 18 and over, there were 88.4 males.

The median income for a household in the city was $31,354, and the median income for a family was $32,188. Males had a median income of $27,778 versus $22,143 for females. The per capita income for the city was $15,779. About 4.7% of families and 5.5% of the population were below the poverty line, including 4.9% of those under the age of eighteen and 10.5% of those 65 or over.

Education
The Tri-County Community School District operates local area public schools.

References

Cities in Iowa
Cities in Keokuk County, Iowa
Populated places established in 1879
1879 establishments in Iowa